Joy Eden Harrison (born September 4, 1962) is an American singer, songwriter, and musician. She has released three critically acclaimed CDs, the late 1990s Angel Town, the 2002 Unspoken, and most recently, 2006's Blue Venus. She won Best Jazz Artist in The 2002 Independent Music Awards for Unspoken, selected by judges Tom Waits, Arturo Sandoval and Don Byron.

Harrison has had two of her songs featured in Hollywood films. The Love Beneath Your Lies is in the film Curtain Call. Marlene is in the film Suicide Kings.

Harrison claims that her lyrical complexity reflects her link to her great aunt, novelist Anzia Yezierska, while her musical gifts and connection to the jazz era come from her great uncle, Milton Ager, the composer of Happy Days Are Here Again.

References

Living people
1962 births
American women singer-songwriters
American singer-songwriters
Place of birth missing (living people)
Independent Music Awards winners
21st-century American women